Phụng Hiệp is a rural district (huyện) of Hậu Giang province in the Mekong Delta region of Vietnam. The district is split into 3 commune-level towns Cây Dương (capital), Búng Tàu and Kinh Cùng, and 12 rural communes: Bình Thành, Hiệp Hưng, Hòa An, Hòa Mỹ, Long Thạnh, Phụng Hiệp, Phương Bình, Phương Phú, Tân Bình, Tân Long, Tân Phước Hưng, Thạnh Hòa.

Districts of Hậu Giang province